"Goodbye" is a song by English indie rock band The Coral taken from their debut album The Coral (2002). Released in July 2002, it was the second single taken from the album and charted at #21.

Music video
The music video was directed by Laurence Easeman. The video was inspired by the Wickerman, filmed in Greenfield, Holywell just outside Flint, Wales.

Track listing

Personnel
The Coral
 James Skelly – vocals, guitar, co-producer
 Lee Southall – guitar, co-producer
 Bill Ryder-Jones – guitar, trumpet, co-producer
 Paul Duffy – bass guitar, saxophone, co-producer
 Nick Power – keyboards, co-producer
 Ian Skelly – drums, co-producer, artwork

Production
 Ian Broudie – producer
 Jon Gray – engineer
 Kenny Patterson – assistant engineer

Other personnel
 Laurence Easeman – video director

Chart performance

References

External links
 
 
 
 

2002 singles
The Coral songs
2002 songs
Songs written by James Skelly
Song recordings produced by Ian Broudie
Deltasonic singles